Lisa Schwarzbaum (born July 5, 1952) is an American film critic. She joined Entertainment Weekly as a film critic in the 1990s and remained there until February 2013.

Career
She has been featured on CNN, co-hosted Siskel & Ebert at the Movies, and worked as a cultural, theater, and television reviewer.

Schwarzbaum is featured in the 2009 documentary For the Love of Movies: The Story of American Film Criticism describing the importance and impact of two women critics, Molly Haskell and Janet Maslin, and also recalling the effect on her as a child watching the Joseph Losey film The Boy with Green Hair (1948). The film shows that Schwarzbaum played viola and started out writing about music.

Her career began in Boston, where she reviewed classical music for The Real Paper and wrote for The Boston Globe.  She has also written for the New York Daily News The New York Times Magazine, Vogue, and Redbook. She is a member of the National Society of Film Critics.

In her final column for Entertainment Weekly, she wrote,
I've spent 22 years at Entertainment Weekly, 19 of them as a critic—a glorious tenure that ends with this issue. ... I once received an effing cool email from Josh Brolin telling me, and I quote, "You can f---ing write!" and promising to be in my movie. Not that I have any plans whatsoever to write a screenplay ... (my plans include a book, an online project, speaking engagements about popular culture—oh, and a dog!)

Bibliography

Articles

References

External links
 

1952 births
Living people
American film critics
Time (magazine) people
American women film critics
American women journalists
Journalists from New York City
People from Queens, New York
20th-century American journalists
20th-century American women writers
21st-century American journalists
21st-century American women writers